Miss Normandy is a French beauty pageant which selects a representative for the Miss France national competition from the region of Normandy. Women representing the region under various different titles have competed at Miss France since 1952, although the Miss Normandy title was not used regularly until 1979.

The current Miss Normandy is Perrine Prunier, who was crowned Miss Normandy 2022 on 21 October 2022. Seven women from Normandy have been crowned Miss France:
Monique Negler, who was crowned Miss France 1958
Jeanne Beck, who was crowned Miss France 1967
Isabelle Benard, who was crowned Miss France 1981
Marine Robine, who was crowned Miss France 1984
Cindy Fabre, who was crowned Miss France 2005
Malika Ménard, who was crowned Miss France 2010
Amandine Petit, who was crowned Miss France 2021

Results summary
Miss France: Monique Negler (1957); Jeanne Beck (1966); Isabelle Benard (1980); Martine Robine (1983); Cindy Fabre (2004); Malika Ménard (2009); Amandine Petit (2020)
1st Runner-Up: Céline Marteau (1989)
2nd Runner-Up: Thérèse Martin-Dubuard (1952); Michelle Beaurain (1968)
3rd Runner-Up: Martine Babouot (1981)
4th Runner-Up: Sarah Tillard (2001); Youssra Askry (2021)
5th Runner-Up: Marie-Dominique Boucourt (1984); Marine Clautour (2019)
6th Runner-Up: Sylviane Covet (1982); Estelle Celayeta (1995); Émilie Duvivier (1998)
Top 12/Top 15: Mylène Roxin (1992); Johanna Moreau (2008); Juliette Polge (2010); Esther Houdement (2016)

Titleholders

Notes

References

External links

Miss France regional pageants
Beauty pageants in France
Women in France